Diplopseustis pallidalis is a moth in the family Crambidae. It was described by William Warren in 1896 and is found in India (Khasi Hills).

References

Spilomelinae
Endemic fauna of India
Moths described in 1896
Moths of Asia
Taxa named by William Warren (entomologist)